Chrome Dreams II is the 28th studio album by Canadian-American musician Neil Young. The album was released on October 23, 2007 as a double LP and as a single CD. The album name references Chrome Dreams, a legendary Neil Young album from 1977 that had originally been scheduled for release but was shelved in favor of American Stars 'N Bars.

The album debuted on the U.S. Billboard 200 chart at number 11, selling about 54,000 copies in its first week. In addition, the song "No Hidden Path" was nominated for a Grammy Award for Best Solo Rock Vocal Performance at the 51st Grammy Awards, 2009.

Production
Chrome Dreams II was produced by The Volume Dealers (Neil Young & Niko Bolas), and features the ensemble of Crazy Horse drummer Ralph Molina, pedal steel guitarist and dobro player Ben Keith (Harvest, Comes A Time, Harvest Moon) and bassist Rick Rosas (Freedom, Living With War, This Note's for You). A horn section, The Blue Note Horns, appear on one track, "Ordinary People," while the Young People’s Chorus of New York City appear on "The Way." Most of the recording was done live with few overdubs at Feelgood's Garage studio near Redwood City, California, with two vintage gas pumps out front and vintage studio gear inside.

According to Young,

It's an album with a form based on some of my original recordings, with a large variety of songs, rather than one specific type of song. Where Living with War and Everybody's Rockin' were albums focused on one subject or style, Chrome Dreams II is more like After the Gold Rush or Freedom, with different types of songs working together to form a feeling. Now that radio formats are not as influential as they once were, it's easier to release an album that crosses all formats with a message that runs through the whole thing, regardless of the type of song or sound. Some early listeners have said that this album is positive and spiritual. I like to think it focuses on the human condition. Like many of my recordings, this one draws on earlier material here and there. I used to do that a lot back in the day. Some songs, like 'Ordinary People,' need to wait for the right time. I think now is the right time for that song and it lives well with the new songs I have written in the past few months. I had a blast making this music. 

The first three songs of Chrome Dreams II date from the 1980s. "Beautiful Bluebird" was first recorded for the original version of Old Ways that was shelved by Geffen Records; "Boxcar" was a track on the unreleased Times Square album, which was scrapped in favor of the more commercially viable Freedom; and "Ordinary People," which was recorded in summer 1988 for what became the Freedom album, was often played live during the "Sponsored by Nobody" tour with the Bluenotes to promote the album This Note's for You. This was the album's first single, and was sent to radio on Monday, September 10. The length of this track (clocking in at 18:13) makes it hard to program into today's limited radio playlists, so it was initially heard on radio web sites.

Track listing

Personnel

Primary musicians
 Neil Young – acoustic & electric guitars, banjo, harmonica, grand piano, pump organ, Hammond B-3 organ, vibes, percussion, vocal
 Ben Keith – pedal steel guitar, lap slide guitar, Dobro, electric guitar, Hammond B-3 organ, vocal
 Rick Rosas – bass guitar, vocal
 Ralph Molina – drums, percussion, vocal

Musicians for "Ordinary People"
 Neil Young – electric guitar, vocal
 Joe Canuck – vocal
 Frank "Poncho" Sampedro – guitar
 Rick Rosas – bass guitar
 Chad Cromwell – drums
 Ben Keith – alto saxophone
 Steve Lawrence – tenor saxophone, keyboards
 Larry Cragg – baritone saxophone
 Claude Cailliet – trombone
 John Fumo – trumpet
 Tom Bray – trumpet (solo)

Background singers
 The Wyatt Earps – Ben Keith, Ralph Molina, Neil Young
 The Jane Wyatts – Nancy Hall, Annie Stocking, Pegi Young
 The Dirty Old Men – Larry Cragg, Ben Keith, Ralph Molina, Rick Rosas, Neil Young

"The Way" choir
The Young People’s Chorus of New York City
 Francisco J. Núñez, Artistic Director/Founder
 Elizabeth Núñez, Conductor

Choristers
 Rebecca Shaw
 Vera Kahn
 Moraima Avalos
 William Cabiniss
 Che Elliott
 Rosa Loveszy
 Christina Lu
 Jamal Marcelin
 Lluvia Perez
 Owen Smith
 Julie Urena
 Emily Viola
 Reginald Wilson
 Catherine McGough
 Helen Parzick

Production 
Recorded at- Feelgood's Garage  (except Ordinary People and The Way choir session)
Recorded and mixed by- Niko Bolas
Assisting Engineers- John Hausmann, Rob Clark
L.A. Johnson- in studio 
Will Mitchell- in studio sound
Larry Cragg- guitar tech
Harry Sitam- senior technical engineer
Digital editing- Rob Clark
Analog-Digital transfers by John Nowland
Mastered by Tim Mulligan

Ordinary People
Recorded at Plywood ANALOG
Recorded and mixed by- Niko Bolas
Assistant Engineers- Brent Walton, Tim McColm
Digital editing- Tim Mulligan
Analog-Digital transfers by John Nowland
Mastered by Tim Mulligan

The Way- choir session
Recorded at Avatar Studios, New York City
Recorded by- Niko Bolas
Assistant engineer- Colin Suzuki
2nd assistant engineer- Eric Pfeifer
Choir arrangements by Darrell Brown & Neil Young

Elliot Roberts- direction
Bonnie Levetin- Lookout Management

DVD Production 
Directed By Bernard Shakey
Produced By L.A. Johnson
Executive Producer Elliot Rabinowitz
Associate Producer Will Mitchell
Edited by Toshi Onuki, Mike Derrosset
DVD Art Direction- Toshi Onuki
DVD Authoring and Menus Design- Rich Winter
Post Production at Total Media Group
Principle Images by Larry Cragg
Additional Images by Will Mitchell, L. A. Johnson and Anthony Crawford

Charts

See also 
 Chrome Dreams

References 

Neil Young albums
2007 albums
Reprise Records albums
Albums produced by Neil Young
Albums produced by Niko Bolas
Sequel albums